Onnen is a surname. Notable people with the surname include:

Eike Onnen (born 1982), German high jumper
Imke Onnen (born 1994), German high jumper
Tony Onnen (born 1938), American politician